Tacaratu is a municipality in the state of Pernambuco, Brazil. The population in 2020, according with IBGE is 26,106 and the area is 1264.5 km2.

Demographics
The indigenous Pankararú people live in Brejo dos Padres and other villages of Tacaratu.

Geography

 State - Pernambuco
 Region - São Francisco Pernambucano
 Boundaries - Floresta   (N);  Jatobá and Alagoas state  (S);  Inajá and Alagoas  (E);  Petrolândia  (W)
 Area - 1264.5 km2
 Elevation - 14 m
 Hydrography - Moxotó river
 Vegetation - Caatinga hiperxerófila.
 Climate - Semi arid ( Sertão) hot and dry
 Annual average temperature - 24.1 c
 Distance to Recife - 458 km

The municipality contains part of the  Serra Negra Biological Reserve, a strictly protected conservation unit created in 1982.

Economy

The main economic activities in Tacaratu are based in general industry, commerce and agribusiness, especially creation of cattle, goats and sheep;  and plantations of mangoes and beans.

Economic Indicators

Economy by Sector
2006

Health Indicators

References

Municipalities in Pernambuco